Frank Lone Star was a professional football player for the Columbus Panhandles in 1920. He played at the collegiate level at Carlisle Indian Industrial School.

Biography
Frank Lone Star was born on January 27, 1887, in Wisconsin.
Frank Lone Star (often written as Lonestar) attended Carlisle Indian School but there is no record of him having played on the varsity football team.
He died on October 30, 1915, in Shell Lake, Wisconsin, of heart problems brought on by TB.
It appears that someone else played for the Columbus Panhandles under his name.

References

Wisconsin's Carlisle Indian School Immortals, 2011, Tom Benjey,Tuxedo Press, .

Columbus Panhandles players
Carlisle Indians football players
People from Shell Lake, Wisconsin
Players of American football from Wisconsin
Native American players of American football
1887 births
1915 deaths
20th-century deaths from tuberculosis
Tuberculosis deaths in Wisconsin